Jérez del Marquesado is a municipality in the province of Granada, southern Spain. It borders the municipalities of Cogollos de Guadix, Albuñán, Valle del Zalabí, Alquife, Lanteira, Bérchules, Trevélez, Güéjar Sierra and Lugros.

Context 
Jérez, Xeriz in Arabic, was the most important town of the Sened followed by Marquesado del Zenete because of their location near important mineral deposits and a floodplain.

History 
It origins go back to the Prehistoric Era, more specifically to the culture of El Argar with remains of the Neolithic era among remains of the Neolithic era with several mining exploitations from the Bronze Age that continued in Roman times.

In the Roman times, the population would receive the name of Sericus or Sericis to what the Arabs would Mecina or Alcázar (the castle) and Xerix (Seda) because of the coexistence of the two towns; Mecina, the ancient Indians and Xeriz, the Muslim.

The muslim (Xerix) was the predominant one. Consequently Mecina integrated it in the 12th century. Because of its abundance of water, the Nasrid kings of Granada created a farm made out of extensive properties.

In 1960 a DC-4 (R5D-3) US navy aircraft crashed in the foothills of Sierra Nevada in Jérez del Marquesado. The poverty-stricken town, lacking of the equipment required, risked their lives to succeed in the rescue of 24 people.

Economy 
The economy is mainly agrarian, more specifically based on cereals, almonds and olive. There is also bovine, ovine and swine cattle.

In the past, a large part of the economy depended directly on the mines that provided work to the majority of people in town. One of the mineral deposits is the Santa Constanza Mine, from which copper was extracted, located within the municipal territory. The other one was the Alquife Mine, from which iron was extracted until its final closure in June 1997.

Historical Patrimony 
Its urban center houses is form by an important set of Moorish houses, mills and the remains of two medieval fortifications, as well as one of the Mudejar churches. There are remains of a fortress from the Nasrid period and of several medieval fortresses, all of them in a rectangular shape. There are also remains of Arab baths next to the Mudejar church. Subsequent are the "Cruz blanca de las eras", next to the "pond", water tank for the irrigation of its fertile orchards, commemoration of the visit of the Catholic Monarchs in 1489 and the Mudejar church of the 16th century with an excellent coffered ceiling of this time and a cover mix of Christian tastes and Moorish reminiscences in the use of brick.

Tourism and nature 
The main attraction of Jérez del Marquesado it is not only its urban centre. The location at the foot of Sierra Nevada and its national park offers the visitor the possibility of carrying out a multitude of activities: For instance, Climbs to Picón de Jérez, the summit of the region, with more than 3000 meters high. Furthermore, walks through its chestnut forest are others tourist attractions.

Gastronomy 
The history of Jérez del Marquesado has resulted in a wide range of typical foods. For instance, Migas accompanied by fresh fruit. The cod rin-ran, the corn flour gruel, or the empedrao, among others. Desserts such as fried milk or pestiños. And liqueurs like the mistela, made with grape juice, aguardiente and spices from the area.

Holidays 

 Chiscos de San Antón

It is  celebrated on the Saint’s day, the 17th of January. Se celebran el día del Santo, el 17 de enero. The celebration consists on making bonfires (chiscos).

 Candlemas

It is celebrated on February 2. In the morning the procession takes place and then they go out to the zone called chicharro field with the products of the slaughter.

 San Marcos’ day

It is celebrated on April 25, the day of the saint, the procession of San Marcos takes place and then the “sanmarqueros” of the year distribute bread rolls to the people of the town

 Pilgrimage of the Virgen de la Cabeza

On the last Sunday of April, the pilgrimage is celebrated to the Zalabí Valley, carrying the Virgin on horseback.

 Corpus Christi Day

This holiday’s date is variable (end of May or beginning of June) in which the Corpus Christi is celebrated. Altars are made to the Lord.

 Saint Juan and Saint Pedro’s Holiday

This party takes place on June 24 and 29. There are night parties.

 Celebrations of the Virgin of the Tizná

They are celebrated from September 8 to 12, and they consist on the patron saint's festivities. On the 11th and 12 September, the famous enclosures of the town are held, to which many people come from both the town itself and the surrounding area.

 Cattle Market

It is celebrated from October 24 to 27 on the outskirts of the town. It consists on a meeting of farmers for the sale and purchase of livestock. In this fair cattle are also exhibited and you can taste the traditional and typical gastronomy of the area.

Images

References 

Municipalities in the Province of Granada